The canton of Saint-Louis is an administrative division of the Haut-Rhin department, northeastern France. It was created at the French canton reorganisation which came into effect in March 2015. Its seat is in Saint-Louis.

It consists of the following communes:

Attenschwiller
Blotzheim
Buschwiller
Folgensbourg
Hagenthal-le-Bas
Hagenthal-le-Haut
Hégenheim
Hésingue
Huningue
Knœringue
Leymen
Liebenswiller
Michelbach-le-Bas
Michelbach-le-Haut
Neuwiller
Ranspach-le-Bas
Ranspach-le-Haut
Rosenau
Saint-Louis
Village-Neuf
Wentzwiller

References

Cantons of Haut-Rhin